Yang Bo (born 23 August 1978) is a Chinese archer. He competed in the men's individual and team events at the 2000 Summer Olympics.

References

1978 births
Living people
Chinese male archers
Olympic archers of China
Archers at the 2000 Summer Olympics
Place of birth missing (living people)